Wilhelm Wallbaum (born 4 April 1876 in Werther (Westfalen); died September 1933 in Berlin) was a German union official and politician. He was prominent within the Christian Social Party and the German National People's Party, of which he was a co-founder.

1876 births
1933 deaths